Tasiman (died 7 December 2020) was an Indonesian politician.

Biography
He served as the Regent of Pati Regency, in Central Java province, for two consecutive terms from 2001 to 2011.

Tasiman, who also suffered from diabetes, died from complications of COVID-19 at RAA Soewondo Pati Hospital in Pati city on 7 December 2020, during the COVID-19 pandemic in Indonesia. He is buried in Juwana, Pati Regency.

References

Date of birth unknown
Year of birth unknown
2020 deaths
Mayors and regents of places in Central Java
People from Pati Regency
Deaths from the COVID-19 pandemic in Indonesia
Regents of places in Indonesia